St. Irvyne; or, The Rosicrucian: A Romance is a Gothic horror novel written by Percy Bysshe Shelley in 1810 and published by John Joseph Stockdale in December of that year, dated 1811, in London anonymously as "by a Gentleman of the University of Oxford" while the author was an undergraduate. The main character is Wolfstein, a solitary wanderer, who encounters Ginotti, an alchemist of the Rosicrucian or Rose Cross Order who seeks to impart the secret of immortality. The book was reprinted in 1822 by Stockdale and in 1840 in The Romancist and the Novelist's Library: The Best Works of the Best Authors, Vol. III, edited by William Hazlitt. The novella was a follow-up to Shelley's first prose work, Zastrozzi, published earlier in 1810. St. Irvyne was republished in 1986 by Oxford University Press as part of the World's Classics series along with Zastrozzi and in 2002 by Broadview Press.

Nicole Berry translated the novel in a French edition in 1999. A Spanish edition entitled St. Irvyne o el Rosacruz, translated by Gregorio Cantera Chamorro, was published by Celeste in Madrid in 2002 with an introduction and notes by Roberto Cueto. The book was translated into Swedish by KG Johansson in 2013 in an edition by Vertigo. A translation in Persian or Iranian was published in 2023 by Qoqnus by Mehrdad Vosuqi.

Major characters

 Wolfstein, a solitary wanderer, an outcast
 Ginotti, also known as Frederic Nempere, an alchemist, member of the Rosicrucian, or Rose Cross, secret sect
 Megalena de Metastasio, befriends Wolfstein
 Cavigni, leader of the bandits
 Steindolph, a bandit
 Ardolph, chosen as chieftain of the bandits after the death of Cavigni
 Agnes, serves the bandits
 Olympia della Anzasca, seduces Wolfstein in Genoa
 Eloise de St. Irvyne, Wolfstein's sister
 Chevalier Mountfort, a friend of Ginotti/Nempere
 Fitzeustace, befriends Eloise
 Madame de St. Irvyne, Eloise's mother
 Marianne, Eloise's sister

Epigraph

The epigraph for chapter three is from Paradise Lost (1667) by John Milton, Book II, 681-683:

"Whence and what art thou, execrable shape,
That dar'st, though grim and terrible, advance
Thy miscreated Front athwart my way."

Plot

The novel opens amidst a raging thunderstorm. Wolfstein is a wanderer in the Swiss Alps who seeks cover from the storm. He is a disillusioned outcast from society who seeks to kill himself. A group of monks carrying a body for burial in a torch-light procession runs into him and saves his life. Bandits attack them and take Wolfstein to an underground hideout. He meets Megalena, whom the bandits have abducted after killing her father in an ambush. After Steindolph, one of the bandits, recites a ballad about the reanimation of the corpse of a nun named Rosa, Wolfstein manages to poison the leader of the bandits, Cavigni, in a second attempt. He is able to escape with Megalena. Ginotti, a member of the bandits, befriends Wolfstein.

Wolfstein and Megalena flee to Genoa where they live together. Olympia, a woman of the town, seduces Wolfstein. Megalena, enraged by the relationship, demands that Wolfstein kill Olympia. Armed with a dagger, Wolfstein is unable to kill her. Olympia kills herself.

Ginotti follows Wolfstein. Ginotti is a member of the Rosicrucian, or Rose Cross, Order. He is an alchemist who seeks the secret of immortality. He tells Wolfstein that he will give him the secret to immortality if he will renounce his faith and join the sect.

Eloise de St. Irvyne is the sister of Wolfstein who lives in Geneva, Switzerland. Ginotti, under his new identity of Frederic Nempere, travels to Geneva and seeks to seduce her.

Ginotti reveals his experiments in his lifelong quest to find the secret of eternal life: "From my earliest youth, before it was quenched by complete
satiation, curiosity, and a desire of unveiling the latent mysteries of nature, was the passion by which all the other emotions of my mind were intellectually organized. ... Natural philosophy at last became the peculiar science to which I directed my eager enquiries." He has studied science and the laws of nature to ascertain the mysteries of life and of being: "I thought of death---... I cannot die.---'Will not this nature---will not the matter of which it is composed---exist to all eternity? Ah! I know it will; and, by the exertions of the energies with which nature has gifted me, well I know it shall.'" Ginotti tells Wolfstein that he will reveal the "secret of immortal life" to him if he will take certain prescribed ingredients and "mix them according to the directions which this book will communicate to you" and meet him in the abbey at St. Irvyne.

In the final scene, which takes place at the abbey of St. Irvyne in France, Wolfstein finds the corpse of Megalena in the vaults. An emaciated Ginotti confronts Wolfstein. Wolfstein is asked if he will deny his Creator. Wolfstein refuses to renounce his faith. Lightning strikes the vaults as thunder and a sulphurous windstorm blast the abbey. Both men are struck dead. This is the penalty they pay for "the delusion of the passions", for tampering with forces that they neither can control nor understand in seeking "endless life".

Reception
The novel, originally intended as a much longer "triple decker" novel, circulated as part of the "circulating libraries" which were popular at that time. This was a source of revenue for the publisher of the novel. Shelley ended the novella abruptly, deciding not to develop or integrate the two strands. The result was a much shorter work.

Critics attacked the novel, which received generally negative reviews. The conservative British periodical The Anti-Jacobin Review and Magazine, in a January 1812 review, castigated "the writer, who can outrage nature and common sense in almost every page of his book". The reviewer sought to deter readers from "the perusal of unprofitable and vicious productions."

French author Maurice Sarfati adapted the novel as Wolfstein et Mégaléna, ou La Vengeance du Rosiccrucien, or Wolfstein and Megalena, the Vengeance of the Rosicrucian, in 1980.

The Wolfstein Chapbooks

The novel was popular enough, however, to be made into two chapbooks in 1822 and 1850. The first chapbook version was entitled Wolfstein; or, The Mysterious Bandit and was published and printed by John Bailey at 116, Chancery Lane in London in 1822 after the original novel was republished that year. The chapbook version was a condensed version of the novella in 28 pages meant for popular consumption, serving the same function as a paperback would. The chapbook sold for sixpence.

The story is described on the title page as "A Terrific Romance" with an epigraph by Ossian: "A tale of horror, of murder, and of deeds done in darkness." Added to Wolfstein was the story The Bronze Statue, A Pathetic Tale by another author, Anna Jane Vardill. "The Bronze Statue" had appeared for the first time in print as part of the "Annals of Public Justice" in The European Magazine of May, 1820, signed "V", i.e., Anna Jane Vardill.

Another more condensed twelve page chapbook was published in 1850 by Thomas Redriffe in London entitled Wolfstein, The Murderer; or, The Secrets of a Robber's Cave: A Terrific Romance. To which is Added, The Two Serpents, an Oriental Apologue. The Ossian epigraph appeared on the title page: "A tale of horror, of murder, and of deeds done in darkness." Printed for Thomas Redriffe, Piccadilly. The price was "Two-Pence".

External links

 Online edition of St. Irvyne, or, The Rosicrucian, A Romance on the Gutenberg website.
 Audiorecordings of the poem "Sister Rosa: A Ballad" on the reanimation of a corpse from Chapter 2 by LibriVox.
 The Magpie Mason, October 10, 2008.

1811 British novels
British novellas
English Gothic novels
Fiction about alchemy
British horror novels
Natural philosophy
Rosicrucianism
Works by Percy Bysshe Shelley
Works published anonymously